TV Action Jazz! is an album by American jazz guitarist Mundell Lowe and his All Stars featuring their interpretations of theme music from private eye, legal and police drama television programs recorded in 1959 for the RCA Camden label.

Reception

Allmusic awarded the album 4 stars with its review by Scott Yanow stating, "this is an album worth searching for. The solos are excellent and the music is much better than expected".

Track listing
 "Peter Gunn" (Henry Mancini) - 2:21   
 ""Mike Hammer" (David Kahn, Melvyn Leonard) - 3:13   
 "Perry Mason Theme" (Fred Steiner) - 1:51   
 "77 Sunset Strip" (Mack David, Jerry Livingston) - 4:46   
 "M Squad" (Count Basie) - 4:19   
 "The Thin Man" (Pete Rugolo) - 2:34   
 "Naked City" (George Duning, Ned Washington) - 4:27   
 "Fall Out! (from Peter Gunn)" (Mancini) - 3:50

Personnel 
Mundell Lowe - guitar 
Donald Byrd - trumpet 
Jimmy Cleveland - trombone
Herbie Mann - flute, tenor saxophone (uncredited)
Tony Scott - clarinet, baritone saxophone
Eddie Costa - piano, vibraphone 
Don Payne - bass
Ed Shaughnessy - drums

References 

 

1959 albums
Mundell Lowe albums
RCA Camden Records albums
Television music